The AN/PEQ-1 also known as a Special Operations Forces Laser Acquisition Marker (SOFLAM or SOF-LAM) or the Ground Laser Target Designator (GLTD) is a U.S. military laser designator designed for use by special operations forces (SOF), including Combat Control Teams (CCT), Joint Terminal Attack Controllers (JTAC), and Tactical Air Control Parties (TACP), under rugged field conditions. Using the SOFLAM, soldiers can mark targets for close air support and artillery; in combination with GPS systems it can also generate coordinates for precision guided munitions. With the SOFLAM and other target designators, support fires can be called in extremely close to friendly forces while avoiding friendly fire.

History

The AN/PEQ-1 was first used in combat in the War in Afghanistan, then later in the Iraq War. Close air support called in via SOFLAM by SOF like the "Horse Soldiers" from 5th Special Forces ODAs, embedded CIA officers, and other forces, contributed heavily to US and allied victories during the invasion of Afghanistan. It was used during the during the capture of Mazar-i-Sharif, the capture of Bagram Airfield, and the Fall of Kandahar, among many other engagements.

Some complaints were made about its weight and power consumption which necessitated bringing multiple replacement batteries. In its earlier configurations, the AN/PEQ-1 did not have a laser rangefinder nor could it interface directly with GPS devices. Both the laser rangefinder and GPS interface capabilities were added with later versions.

References

External  links

 Night Warrior Handbook Archived
 Specifications sheet (Archive)
 AN/PEQ-1 at GlobalSecurity.org Archived

Special Operations Forces of the United States
Military electronics of the United States
Laser aiming modules